Fayu may refer to:
 Fayu Atoll, also known as East Fayu, an atoll in Chuuk State, Micronesia
 Piagailoe Atoll, also known as West Fayu, an atoll in Yap State, Micronesia
Fayu people in Western New Guinea
Fayu language
Fayu Temple, one of three major temples in Mount Putuo, Zhejiang province, China